Johan Eino Kilpi (7 June 1889, Uusikaupunki – 7 June 1963; original surname Blomros) was a Finnish journalist and politician. He served as Minister of Social Affairs from 17 April 1945 to 26 March 1946, Minister of Education from 26 March 1946 to 26 May 1946 and Minister of the Interior from 26 May to 29 July 1948. He was a member of the Parliament of Finland, representing the Social Democratic Party of Finland (SDP) from 1930 to 1933 and the Finnish People's Democratic League (SKDL) from 1948 to 1962. He was the candidate of the SKDL in the presidential elections of 1956, getting 18.7% of the vote. He was married to Sylvi-Kyllikki Kilpi.

References

1889 births
1963 deaths
People from Uusikaupunki
People from Turku and Pori Province (Grand Duchy of Finland)
Social Democratic Party of Finland politicians
Finnish People's Democratic League politicians
Ministers of Education of Finland
Ministers of the Interior of Finland
Members of the Parliament of Finland (1930–33)
Members of the Parliament of Finland (1948–51)
Members of the Parliament of Finland (1951–54)
Members of the Parliament of Finland (1954–58)
Members of the Parliament of Finland (1958–62)